Kupol Airport is an airport which services the eponymously named gold and silver mine, which is one of the largest gold and silver mines in the Russian Far East.

It was built by the Kinross Gold Corporation. It is used to support the needs of its enterprise's operations in the Anadyr region of the Chukotka Autonomous Okrug (400 km northwest of the city of Anadyr).

The nearest village is Ilirney, located 96 km from airport.

Climate 
The airport is placed in the permafrost zone with a subarctic climate. The cold season lasts about 8 months.

Facilities 
The airport only operates based on its scheduled flights. It is able to handle aircraft such as the Bombardier Q Series, Antonov An-12, Antonov An-74, Antonov An-140, Antonov An-24, Antonov An-26, Yak-40, and helicopters of all types.

Airlines and destinations

Accidents and incidents 

 On 7 March 2019, a Bombardier DHC 8-Q400 run by Aurora, en route from Magadan, rolled off the runway at 12:30 pm, damaging the runway's light-signaling equipment. On board, there were 68 passengers and 5 crew members. There were no injuries, and the airplane received minimal damage. The lights were replaced the same day and the airport remained functional.

References 

Airports in Chukotka Autonomous Okrug